Abu Faraj al-Libi (أبو الفرج الليبي) (also transliterated al-Libbi ) is an assumed name or nom de guerre of a Libyan alleged to be a senior member of the al-Qaeda terrorist organization. His real name is Mustafa Faraj Muhammad Muhammad Masud al-Jadid al-Uzaybi. He was arrested by Pakistan's Inter-Services Intelligence (ISI) on May 2, 2005, in Mardan ( north of Peshawar). Finding al-Libi was a joint effort of the Central Intelligence Agency's (CIA) Special Activities Division and Pakistan's Special Forces.

Since September 2006, al-Libi has been held in American military custody in the Guantanamo Bay detention camp, having previously been held at a secret location.

According to the US Office of the Director of National Intelligence, he served as the third in command of al-Qaeda, from the 2003 capture of Khalid Sheikh Mohammed to his own capture in 2005.

Background
In approximately 2000, al-Libi was living in the Karte Parwan district of Kabul, Afghanistan.

In August 2004, Pakistani officials stated that al-Libi had become "number three" in al-Qaeda as "director of operations", a role once filled by Khalid Sheikh Mohammed.

Upon al-Libi's arrest on May 2, 2005, U.S. and Pakistani authorities continued to claim him as the third most important figure in al-Qaeda. According to the BBC and Voice of America (VOA) reports, he was riding pillion on a motorbike when he and his driver were ambushed by Pakistani agents, some of whom were wearing burqas. A VOA reporter from Mardan said that while being apprehended, al-Libi tried to destroy a notebook, which U.S. agents took and have tried to decode.

U.S. agents had been trying to find al-Libi as a link to finding Osama bin Laden. Plainclothes Pakistani agents arrived in Mardan and waited for him to arrive.

Abu Faraj al-Libi was identified by Pakistani authorities as the main planner of the 2006 transatlantic aircraft plot. He is also a suspect in two assassination attempts against Pakistani President General Pervez Musharraf. According to The New York Times, "Mr. Libbi's suspected accomplice in those attacks was a well-known Pakistani militant named Amjad Farooqi, who was also implicated in the murder of the 'Wall Street Journal' reporter Daniel Pearl in February 2002. Mr. Farooqi was killed last September in a shootout with security forces in southern Pakistan."

In the early reporting of this capture, there was confusion between the names and identities of Abu Faraj al-Libi and another wanted al-Qaeda fugitive, Anas al-Liby. Al-Libi is not a surname, but an adjective, meaning the Libyan. Such adjectives of nationality are used in nicknames, and sometimes to resolve ambiguity; they often have several alternative English transliterations.

Scholars at the Brookings Institution, led by Benjamin Wittes, listed the captives still held in Guantanamo in December 2008, according to whether their detention was justified by certain common allegations:

 Abu Faraj Libi was listed as one of the captives who was a member of the "al Qaeda leadership cadre".
 Abu Faraj Libi was listed as one of the "82 detainees made no statement to CSRT or ARB tribunals or made statements that do not bear materially on the military's allegations against them."

Guantanamo Review Task Force

On January 21, 2009, the day he was inaugurated, United States President Barack Obama issued three executive orders related to the detention of individuals in Guantanamo Bay detention camp.
That new review system was composed of officials from six departments, where the OARDEC reviews were conducted entirely by the Department of Defense. When it reported back, a year later, the Guantanamo Review Task Force classified some individuals as too dangerous to be transferred from Guantanamo, even though there was insufficient evidence to justify charging them. On April 9, 2013, that document was made public after a Freedom of Information Act request.
Abu Faraj al-Libi was one of the 71 individuals deemed unable to be charged due to insufficient evidence, but too dangerous to release.
Obama said those deemed unable to be charged due to insufficient evidence, but too dangerous to release would start to receive reviews from a Periodic Review Board.

Periodic Review Board
The first review was not convened until November 20, 2013. Al-Libi was denied approval for transfer on September 16, 2016.

References

External links
 UN Secret Detention Report (Part One): The CIA’s “High-Value Detainee” Program and Secret Prisons, Andy Worthington
 "Osama bin Laden’s Death, and the Unjustifiable Defense of Torture and Guantánamo", Andy Worthington
 Who's who in al-Qaeda, BBC News, August 19, 2005
 Press handout photo of Abu Faraj al-Libbi, Pakistan Interior Ministry; photo at MSNBC

1970 births
Living people
Libyan al-Qaeda members
Al-Qaeda leaders
Detainees of the Guantanamo Bay detention camp
Libyan extrajudicial prisoners of the United States
People subject to extraordinary rendition by the United States
Libyan expatriates in Pakistan